Amblyomma patinoi is a species of tick of the genus Amblyomma. The species is associated with the Eastern Cordillera of Colombia. Rickettsia species can habitate A. patinoi endosymbiotically.

References

Further reading

Alves, Alvair Da S., et al. "Seroprevalence of Rickettsia spp. in equids and molecular detection of ‘Candidatus Rickettsia amblyommii’in Amblyomma cajennense sensu lato ticks from the Pantanal region of Mato Grosso, Brazil." Journal of Medical Entomology 51.6 (2014): 1242-1247.
Estrada-Peña, Agustín, et al. "Divergent environmental preferences and areas of sympatry of tick species in the Amblyomma cajennense complex (Ixodidae)." International journal for parasitology 44.14 (2014): 1081-1089.

Amblyomma
Animals described in 2014
Arachnids of South America